María Castro (born 13 November 1953) is a Salvadoran former swimmer. She competed in the women's 100 metre breaststroke at the 1968 Summer Olympics.

References

1953 births
Living people
Salvadoran female swimmers
Olympic swimmers of El Salvador
Swimmers at the 1968 Summer Olympics
Sportspeople from San Salvador
Female breaststroke swimmers
20th-century Salvadoran women
21st-century Salvadoran women